The Baghdadi Museum (Arabic: المتحف البغدادي) is a local history museum located in and about the capital city of Baghdad, Iraq. It was established in 1940. 

The museum is situated near the River Tigris. It features 70 scenes from different periods using lifesize models presenting Baghdad life, especially folk crafts, trades, professions, local customs, and street life. The museum suffered damage due to the American invasion during the Iraq War in 2003 causing suspension of its operation. It officially reopened in August 2008.

Gallery

References

1970 establishments in Iraq
Museums established in 1970
Museums in Baghdad
History museums in Iraq
City museums in Iraq
Folk museums in Asia